The 2011 Dominion Tankard, southern Ontario men's provincial curling championship was held February 7–13 at the Peach King Centre in Grimsby, Ontario.  The winning team of Glenn Howard will represent Ontario at the 2011 Tim Hortons Brier in London, Ontario.

Teams

Standings

Round robin

All times EST

Draw 1
February 7, 2:00pm

Draw 2
February 7, 7:30pm

Draw 3
February 8, 2:00pm

Draw 4
February 8, 7:00pm

Draw 5
February 9, 9:00am

Draw 6
February 9, 2:00pm

Draw 7
February 9, 7:00pm

Draw 8
February 10, 2:00pm

Draw 9
February 10, 7:00pm

Draw 10
February 11, 2:00pm

Draw 11
February 11, 7:00pm

Playoffs

1 vs. 2
February 12, 2:00 PM ET

3 vs. 4
February 12, 7:00 PM ET

Semifinal
February 13, 9:30 AM ET

Final
February 13, 2:00 PM ET

Qualification

Zone 1
December 11–12, Brockville Country Club

Kevin Baker (Cornwall)
Charles Wert (Cornwall)
Ian MacAulay (Ottawa)
Matt Paul (Ottawa)
Gary Rowe (Ottawa)
Jeff McCrady (Ottawa)
Shane Latimer (Ottawa)
Ron Hrycak (Ottawa)

Zone 2
December 11–12, Brockville Country Club
Steve Lodge (Brockville)
Greg Richardson (Rideau)
Bryan Cochrane (Rideau)
Howard Rajala (Rideau)
Bill Blad (Rideau)
Blair Dawes (Rideau)
Frank O'Driscoll (Rideau)

Zone 3
December 10–12, Renfrew Curling Club
Dennis Elgie (City View)
Josh Adams (Granite)
Steve Allen (Renfrew)
Damien Villard (Renfrew)
Chris Gardner (Renfrew)

Zone 4
December 10–12, Trenton Curling Club
Scott Davey (Cataraqui)
Jim Marshall (Land O'Lakes)
Greg Balsdon (Loonie)
Rob Dickson (Napanee)
Paul Dickson (Napanee)
Joe Tuer (Quinte)
Dennis Murray (Quinte)
Paul Wood (Royal Kingston)
Bryce Rowe (Land O'Lakes)
David Collyer (Royal Kingston)

Zone 5
December 10–12, Bancroft Curling Club
Nick Avlontis (Lakefield)
Mike Moloney (Lakefield)
Jim O'Marra (Peterborough)
Jason Hogan (Peterborough)
Jon St. Denis (Peterborough)
Bill Harrison (Woodville)
Mike McLean (Peterborough)

Zone 6
December 11–13, Tam Heather Tennis & Curling Club, Scarborough
Mark Kean (Annandale)
Nathan Martin (Oshawa)
Ian Gibson (Oshawa Golf)
Wayne Warren (Tam Heather)
Tim Morrison (Unionville)
Scott McPherson (Unionville)
Bruce Jefferson (Uxbridge)
Gary Grant (Uxbridge)
Rob Lobel (Whitby)
Jason March (Whitby)
John Bell (Unionville)

Zone 7
December 11–12, Bayview Golf & Country Club, Thornhill
John Epping (Donalda)
Aidan Ritchie (East York)
Michael Shepherd (East York)
Dennis Moretto (Richmond Hill)
Peter Matthews (Richmond Hill)
Dave Coutanche (Richmond Hill)
Mike Anderson (Thornhill)
Duane Lindner (York)
Jordan Keon (Richmond Hill)
Gregg Truscott (Scarboro)

Zone 8
December 11–15, Weston Golf & Country Club
Jonathan Braden (High Park)
Roy Arndt (High Park)
Mike Harris (Oakville)
Guy Racette (Royal Canadian)
Ian Fleming (Royal Canadian)
Josh Johnston (Royal Canadian)
Wayne Middaugh (St. George's)
Bill Duck (St. George's)

Zone 9
December 10–12, Alliston Curling Club
Willy MacPherson (Alliston)
Peter Corner (Brampton)
Andrew McGaugh (Brampton)
Rayad Husain (Chinguacousy)
Rob Lipsett (Markdale)
Steve Oldford (Milton)
Dayna Deruelle (Brampton)

Zone 10
December 11–12, Stoud Curling Club
Ken Leach (Barrie)
Cory Heggestad (Barrie)
Travis Dafoe (Bradford)
Dale Matchett (Bradford)
Darcy Weeks (Parry Sound)
Andrew Thompson (Stroud)
Don Campbell (Orillia)

Zone 11
December 11–12, Wiarton Curling Club
Al Hutchinson (Blue Water)
Alan Kemp (Collingwood)
Murray Dougherty (Meaford)
Joey Rettinger (Tara)

Zone 12
December 11–12, Ayr Curling Club
Darcy Perrin (Ayr)
Andrew Fairfull (Guelph)
Robert Rumfeldt (Guelph)
Jared Collie (Kitchener-Waterloo Granite)
Daryl Shane (Kitchener-Waterloo Granite)
Peter Mellor (Kitchener-Waterloo Granite)
Andrew Flemming (Westmount)
Jamie DeHart (Westmount)

Zone 13
December 10–12, Hamilton Victoria Club
Steve Goodger (Dundas Granite)
Ian Robertson (Dundas Valley)
Todd Brandwood (Glendale)
Bill Mackay (Grimsby)
Jason Stahl (Hamilton Victoria)
Simon Ouellet (St. Catharines)
Matt Wilkinson (St. Catharines Golf)
Shane McCready (St. Catharines Golf)
Jason Murray (Burlington)
Steve Henderson (Dundas Granite)
Garth Mitchell (Grimsby)
Curtis Muir (St. Catharines Golf)
Mike Rowe (Burlington)
Geoff Scott (Burlington Golf)

Zone 14
December 10–12, Vanastra Curling Club
Jake Higgs (Harriston)
Mike Schumacher (Teeswater)
Scott McGregor (Wingham)

Zone 15
December 10–12, Tillsonburg & District Curling Club
Jake Walker (Aylmer)
Terry Corbin (Brant)
Travis Fanset (Tillsonburg)
Wayne Tuck Jr. (Woodstock)
Nick Rizzo (Brantford)

Zone 16
December 10–12, Ilderton Curling Club
Perry Smyth (Chatham Granite)
Mark Bice (Sarnia)
Evan Lilly (Highland)
Bob Armstrong (Ilderton)
Bob Stafford (Chatham Granite)
Dale Kelly (Sarnia)

Regions
All on January 8–9 weekend

Region 1 (Zones 1-4)
Cornwall Curling Centre, Cornwall

Region 2 (Zones 5-8)
Uxbdirge and District Curling Club, Uxbridge

Region 3 (Zones 9-12)
Bradford and District Curling Club, Bradford

Region 4 (Zones 13-16)
Teeswater Curling Club, Teeswater

Challenge Rounds
Both are January 21–24

East
Oshawa Curling Club

The B winner must beat the A winner twice in order to advance to the Tankard.

West
Shelburne Curling Club

The B winner must beat the A winner twice in order to advance to the Tankard.

References

Dominion Tankard, 2011
Grimsby, Ontario
Ontario Tankard